Rhigosaurus is a genus of therocephalian therapsids. Its fossils have been found in the Fremouw Formation of Antarctica.

References

 The main groups of non-mammalian synapsids at Mikko's Phylogeny Archive
 Information and a list of animals of the Fremouw Formation

Therocephalia genera
Baurioids
Triassic synapsids
Extinct animals of Antarctica
Triassic Antarctica
Fossils of Antarctica
Fossil taxa described in 1979